Edward Lasquete is a Filipino Pole Vaulter who competed at the 1992 Summer Olympics in Barcelona, Spain. At the Olympics, he was not able to make a podium finish, but set a National Record in Pole Vault by registering a record of 5.0 meters. He is the first Southeast Asian in history to break the 5.0 meter mark in the Pole Vault. This record would only be broken 22 years later in 2014 by Ernest Obiena.

Lasquete attended Mt. Pleasant High School in San Jose, California where in 1990 he bagged the title of California State Champion. He then went on to California Polytechnic State University at San Luis Obispo. Coached by 1972 Olympic bronze medalist in the pole vault, Jan Johnson, Lasquete secured a spot as an NCAA All American. Lasquete also won gold in the pole vault event of the 1991 Southeast Asian Games, 1993 Southeast Asian Games, and 1995 Southeast Asian Games. He settled for the Silver at the 1997 Southeast Asian Games.

References

1971 births
Filipino male pole vaulters
Athletes (track and field) at the 1992 Summer Olympics
American people of Filipino descent
California Polytechnic State University alumni
Olympic track and field athletes of the Philippines
Living people
Southeast Asian Games medalists in athletics
Southeast Asian Games gold medalists for the Philippines
Southeast Asian Games silver medalists for the Philippines
Competitors at the 1991 Southeast Asian Games
Competitors at the 1993 Southeast Asian Games
Competitors at the 1995 Southeast Asian Games
Competitors at the 1997 Southeast Asian Games